Carlos Eduardo Gutiérrez Silva (born December 25, 1976 in Treinta y Tres), or simply Carlos Gutiérrez, is a Uruguayan professional footballer.
He played for Uruguay at the Copa América 2001.

References
 

1976 births
Living people
People from Treinta y Tres
Uruguayan footballers
Uruguayan expatriate footballers
Uruguay international footballers
Liverpool F.C. (Montevideo) players
Club Atlético River Plate (Montevideo) players
Clube Atlético Mineiro players
Central Español players
FC Rostov players
Russian Premier League players
Expatriate footballers in Brazil
Expatriate footballers in Russia
Association football defenders